The following is a list of unproduced Tim Burton projects, in roughly chronological order. During a career that has spanned over 30 years, Tim Burton has worked on a number of projects which never progressed beyond the pre-production stage under his direction.

1980s

After Hours
Burton was originally attached to direct the 1985 film After Hours, but Martin Scorsese read the script at a time when he was unable to get financial backing to complete The Last Temptation of Christ, which was finally completed in 1988; Burton gladly stepped aside when Scorsese expressed interest in directing After Hours.

Big Top Pee-wee
After the 1985 film, Burton was offered the opportunity to direct Big Top Pee-wee, but had no interest and was already working on his own pet project, Beetlejuice.

Hot to Trot
After the success of Pee-wee's Big Adventure (1985), and before his hiring of Beetlejuice (1988), Warner Bros. sent Burton various scripts. He was disheartened by their lack of imagination and originality, one of them being Hot to Trot (1988).

1990s

Conversations with Vincent
Burton held a fascination with Vincent Price films since his childhood. He first worked with the actor on the 1982 short film Vincent, and a second collaboration on the 1983 television film Hansel and Gretel . During the production of Edward Scissorhands (1990), in which Price portrayed the inventor, Burton conceived the idea of making an independent documentary film on the actor, using the working title Conversations with Vincent. With self-financing from his own production company, Burton shot the film in black-and-white over a three-day period at the Vincent Price Gallery in East Los Angeles College in April 1991. In addition to Price, Roger Corman and Samuel Z. Arkoff were interviewed. Conversations with Vincent was stalled when Burton went to work on Batman Returns (1992), and after Price's death in October 1993. In December 1994, it was announced that Burton was returning to the hour-long documentary. Lucy Chase Williams, author of The Complete Films of Vincent Price, was working as a consultant. The film likely would have been released in the direct-to-video market, but the project was ultimately abandoned and remains unfinished.

Beetlejuice sequel attempts
Warren Skaaren wrote a sequel script called Beetlejuice In Love, but was unable to keep polishing his story past the first draft due to his sudden death. Later in 1990, Burton hired writer Jonathan Gems to write a sequel to Beetlejuice, entitled Beetlejuice Goes Hawaiian. In early 1991, Burton was still interested in directing the sequel, and hired Daniel Waters to write yet another script, but the two decided to focus on Batman Returns. Waters story outline involved Beetlejuice appearing in the White House and harassing the Clinton family. By  August 1993, producer David Geffen hired Pamela Norris (Troop Beverly Hills, Saturday Night Live) to rewrite the script. In 1996, Warner Bros. decided to hire Kevin Smith to write another draft of the Hawaiian script, but he turned down the offer to write the script of the unmade Superman Lives. In March 1997, Gems released a statement saying "The Beetlejuice Goes Hawaiian script is still owned by The Geffen Film Company and it will likely never get made. You really couldn't do it now anyway. Winona is too old for the role, and the only way they could make it would be to totally recast it.

In September 2011, Warner Bros. hired Seth Grahame-Smith, who collaborated with Burton on Dark Shadows and Abraham Lincoln: Vampire Hunter, to write and produce a sequel to Beetlejuice. Grahame-Smith signed on with the intention of doing "a story that is worthy of us actually doing this for real, something that is not just about cashing in, is not just about forcing a remake or a reboot down someone's throat." He was also adamant that Michael Keaton would return and that Warner Bros. would not recast the role. Burton and Keaton have not officially signed on but will return if the script is good enough. Grahame-Smith met with Keaton in February 2012, "We talked for a couple of hours and talked about big picture stuff. It's a priority for Warner Bros. It's a priority for Tim. [Michael's] been wanting to do it for 20 years and he'll talk to anybody about it who will listen." The story will be set in a real time frame from 1988; "This will be a true 26 or 27 years later sequel. What's great is that for Beetlejuice , time means nothing in the afterlife, but the world outside is a different story.

In November 2013, Winona Ryder hinted at a possible return for the sequel as well by saying, "I'm kind of sworn to secrecy but it sounds like it might be happening. It's 27 years later. And I have to say, I love Lydia Deetz so much. She was such a huge part of me. I would be really interested in what she is doing 27 years later." Ryder confirmed that she would only consider making a sequel if Burton and Keaton were involved. In December 2014, Burton stated, "It's a character that I love and I miss actually working with Michael. There's only one Betelgeuse. We're working on a script and I think it's probably closer than ever and I'd love to work with him again." In January 2015, writer Grahame-Smith told Entertainment Weekly that the script was finished and that he and Burton intended to start filming Beetlejuice 2 by the end of the year, and that both Keaton and Ryder would return in their respective roles. In August 2015, on Late Night with Seth Meyers, Ryder confirmed she would be reprising her role in the sequel. In May 2016, Burton stated, "It's something that I really would like to do in the right circumstances, but it's one of those films where it has to be right. It's not a kind of a movie that cries out [for a sequel], it's not the Beetlejuice trilogy. So it's something that if the elements are right—because I do love the character and Michael's amazing as that character, so yeah we'll see. But there's nothing concrete yet." In October 2017, Deadline reported that Mike Vukadinovich was hired to write a script in time for the film's 30th anniversary. In April 2019, Warner Bros. stated the sequel had been shelved.

Mai, the Psychic Girl
Beginning in the late 1980s, new wave rock band Sparks attempted to make the Japanese manga Mai, the Psychic Girl into a musical, with interest from Burton and Carolco Pictures, who purchased the film rights in August 1991. Carolco hoped Burton would start production in 1992, but he chose to work on The Nightmare Before Christmas and Ed Wood for Touchstone Pictures. The option on the film rights eventually expired, and Burton dropped out. Francis Ford Coppola later developed the property in the late 1990s. In June 2000, Sony Pictures Entertainment started on a different project with Kirk Wong attached to direct. By February 2001, a script had been written by Lisa Addario and Joey Syracuse for Sony's Columbia Pictures. The release of The Seduction of Ingmar Bergman, a radio musical by Sparks, in August 2009, was informed by the six years the band spent trying to get their Mai, the Psychic Girl produced. The album generated new interest, and gained a "second wind", vocalist Russell Mael explained. "The music is all ready and we are hoping that this still might see the light of day." On May 18, 2010, Burton expressed renewed interest in adapting the property.

The Addams Family
During pre-production of The Addams Family (1991), Burton was considered and approached to direct the film by producer Scott Rudin, but was unable to accept the position due to his commitment to Batman Returns. Filmmaker Terry Gilliam was then approached, but also turned it down, before Barry Sonnenfeld ultimately accepted.

Stay Tuned
Morgan Creek Productions originally wanted Burton to direct Stay Tuned because of his work on Beetlejuice and his art style, but Burton left the project to direct Batman Returns, the sequel to his 1989 Batman film, and was replaced by Peter Hyams while having some of the art styles paying tribute to Burton.

Singles television series
After the 1992 film Singles was released, which had Burton in a rare credited acting role, Warner Bros. Television tried to turn the film into a television series, but the project never materialized. The film's director Cameron Crowe claims that Singles inspired the television series Friends.

Jurassic Park
Before Michael Crichton's novel Jurassic Park was published, Hollywood studios were highly interested in purchasing the film rights. This included Warner Bros. and Burton, Sony Pictures Entertainment and Richard Donner, and 20th Century Fox and Joe Dante. Universal Pictures acquired the rights in May 1990 for Steven Spielberg, resulting in the 1993 film adaptation.

Mary Reilly
Producers Jon Peters and Peter Guber acquired the film rights to Mary Reilly in 1989, and optioned them for Warner Bros. with Roman Polanski as director. When Guber became CEO of Sony Pictures Entertainment later that year, he moved Mary Reilly to Sony's sister company, TriStar Pictures, where Burton was approached to direct with Denise Di Novi to produce in 1991. Christopher Hampton was hired to write the screenplay, and Burton signed on as director in January 1993, after he approved over Hampton's rewrite. He intended to start filming in January 1994, after he completed Ed Wood, but Burton dropped out in May 1993 over his anger against Guber for putting Ed Wood in turnaround. Stephen Frears was TriStar's first choice to replace Burton, and Di Novi was fired and replaced with Ned Tanen. The film ended up becoming the critically and commercially unsuccessful Mary Reilly in 1996, starring Julia Roberts and John Malkovich.

Catwoman

Batman Returns would be the last film in the Warner Bros. Batman film series that featured Burton and Michael Keaton as director and leading actor. With Batman Forever, Warner Bros. decided to go in a "lighter" direction to be more mainstream in the process of a family film. Burton had no interest in returning to direct a sequel, but was credited as producer. With Warner Bros. moving on development for Batman Forever in June 1993, a Catwoman spin-off was announced. Michelle Pfeiffer was to reprise her role, with the character not to appear in Forever because of her own spin-off.

Burton became attached as director, while producer Denise Di Novi and writer Daniel Waters also returned. In January 1994, Burton was unsure of his plans to direct Catwoman or an adaptation of "The Fall of the House of Usher". On June 6, 1995, Waters turned in his Catwoman script to Warner Bros., the same day Batman Forever was released. Burton was still being courted to direct. Waters joked, "Turning it in the day Batman Forever opened may not have been my best logistical move, in that it's the celebration of the fun-for-the-whole-family Batman. Catwoman is definitely not a fun-for-the-whole-family script." In an August 1995 interview, Pfeiffer re-iterated her interest in the spin-off, but explained her priorities would be challenged as a mother and commitments to other projects. The film labored in development hell for years, with Pfeiffer replaced by Ashley Judd. The film ended up becoming the critically panned Catwoman (2004), starring Halle Berry.

Batman Continues 
During the early development of the cancelled Catwoman spin-off, Burton expressed his interest in directing the third installment of the Batman film series that began with Batman in 1989, which would have been titled Batman Continues. Warner Bros. was not happy with merchandise sales based on the second movie, they decided to change him and Burton put Joel Schumacher as the director of the third installment, leading to the release of Batman Forever, in which Burton was given top-billing producer credit, without being able to contribute ideas; only hiring director and screenplayers.

Cabin Boy
In 1993, Burton was set to direct Cabin Boy, but left to direct Ed Wood. Adam Resnick eventually directed the 1994 film, with Burton in a producer role.

Dennis the Menace 
When Warner Bros. Pictures agreed to produce Dennis the Menace in 1993, Production President Terry Semel wanted Burton to direct. The executive producer Ernest Chambers refused and instead hired John Hughes as a writer and producer based on his work with the Home Alone films.

The Fall of the House of Usher
In 1994, Burton was close to directing an adaptation of the Edgar Allan Poe short story "The Fall of the House of Usher" with a screenplay by Jonathan Gems; he chose to direct Mars Attacks! instead.

The Hawkline Monster
Burton was to direct The Hawkline Monster, a western/monster film that was to star Clint Eastwood and Jack Nicholson, with a screenplay by Jonathan Gems; he chose to direct Mars Attacks! instead.

Dinosaurs Attack!
Around 1995, writer Jonathan Gems wrote a screenplay for a film adaptation of Dinosaurs Attack!, with Burton as director. However, both Burton and Gems came to the conclusion that the project was too similar to Jurassic Park.

Toots and the Upside Down House
In 1996, when Burton was the CEO and founder of Walt Disney Animation Studios' stop-motion studio division Skellington Productions, he was going to produce the studio's planned third film, Toots and the Upside Down House, that was based on the book by Carol Hughes where a young girl still grieving over the death of her mother goes to a fantasy world inside her home when her dad still won't pay attention to her, where goblins, fairies and sprites live while helping the fairies battle an evil Jack Frost. Burton was attached to produce it, while Henry Selick was set to direct it (marking the third collaboration between Selick and Burton), with the screenplay written by Steven Soderbergh and co-produced by Disney's film partner at the time Miramax, which would have made it the first original animated film made by the company. However, Disney shut down the film's production, along with Skellington Productions, after the poor box office results of James and the Giant Peach.

Superman Lives

After Kevin Smith had been hired to rewrite  a script called Superman Reborn, he suggested Burton to direct. It was Smith who convinced Warner Bros. to change the title to Superman Lives. Burton signed on with a pay-or-play contract of $5 million and Warner Bros. set a theatrical release date for the summer of 1998, the 60th anniversary of the character's debut in Action Comics. Nicolas Cage was signed on to play Superman, with a $20 million pay-or-play contract, believing he could "reconceive the character". Producer Jon Peters felt Cage could "convince audiences he [Superman] came from outer space." Burton explained Cage's casting would be "the first time you would believe that nobody could recognize Clark Kent as Superman, he [Cage] could physically change his persona." Kevin Spacey was approached for the role of Lex Luthor, while Christopher Walken was Burton's choice for Brainiac, a role also considered for Jim Carrey and Gary Oldman. Sandra Bullock, Courteney Cox and Julianne Moore had been approached for Lois Lane, while Chris Rock was cast as Jimmy Olsen. Michael Keaton confirmed his involvement, but when asked if he would be reprising his role as Batman from Burton's Batman films, he would only reply, "Not exactly."

Burton immediately hired Wesley Strick to write a completely different story about the death and return of Superman. The film entered pre-production in June 1997. Filming was originally set to begin in early 1998. Burton chose Pittsburgh, Pennsylvania as his primary filming location for Metropolis, while start dates for filming were pushed back. For budgetary reasons, Warner Bros. ordered another rewrite from Dan Gilroy, delayed the film and ultimately put it on hold in April 1998. Burton then left to direct Sleepy Hollow. Burton has depicted the experience as a difficult one, citing differences with producer Jon Peters and the studio, stating, "I basically wasted a year. A year is a long time to be working with somebody that you don't really want to be working with."

Goosebumps
When the Goosebumps film was in early production and was going to be made by 20th Century Fox and DreamWorks, Burton was originally going to produce it in 1998, with the option to direct. However, the project fell through and was later sold to Sony Pictures Entertainment, resulting in the 2015 film directed by Rob Letterman.

X: The Man with the X-ray Eyes
Burton developed a script for a remake of the 1963 science fiction B-film X: The Man with the X-ray Eyes with writer Bryan Goluboff, but it went unproduced.

Black Sunday
Around this time, Burton considered directing a remake of the 1960 Italian horror film Black Sunday.

2000s

Tim Burton's Lost in Oz
Tim Burton's Lost in Oz would be a television series based on L. Frank Baum's The Wizard of Oz book series. Burton would be its executive producer. A pilot episode was filmed in 2000, but the series became unproduced due to budget constraints.

Ripley's Believe It or Not!

During the mid-2000s, Burton was scheduled to direct a film based on the famous Ripley's Believe It or Not! franchise, with Jim Carrey portraying Robert Ripley and a script by Ed Wood scribes Scott Alexander and Larry Karaszewski; the film ran over budget however, and was shelved by Paramount Pictures. Burton moved on to direct Sweeney Todd: The Demon Barber of Fleet Street, and on October 23, 2008, Chris Columbus took over the Ripley's Believe It or Not! film, with Carrey still portraying Ripley, and on January 12, 2011, it was reported that Eric Roth will write a new script.

The Nightmare Before Christmas sequel
In 2001, The Walt Disney Company began to consider producing a sequel to The Nightmare Before Christmas, but rather than using stop motion, Disney wanted to use computer animation. Burton convinced Disney to drop the idea. "I was always very protective of Nightmare not to do sequels or things of that kind," Burton explained. "You know, 'Jack visits Thanksgiving world' or other kinds of things just because I felt the movie had a purity to it and the people that like it... Because it's a mass-market kind of thing, it was important to kind of keep that purity of it."

In 2009, Selick said he would do a film sequel if he and Burton could create a good story for it. In February 2019, it was reported that a new Nightmare Before Christmas film was in the works, with Disney considering either a stop-motion sequel or live-action remake. In October 2019, Chris Sarandon expressed interest on reprising his role as Jack Skellington if a sequel film ever materializes.

Planets of the Apes sequel
After the financial success of Planet of the Apes, Burton supposed that 20th Century Fox would hire him to make a sequel, that was planned to explain the cliffhanger ending of the first film, but instead the studio decided to reboot the franchise and in 2011, released Rise of the Planet of the Apes.

Batman: The Musical
In 2002, Burton, Jim Steinman, and David Ives had worked on a theatre production called Batman: The Musical. Steinman has revealed five songs from the musical. The first is the opening theme for "Gotham City" and the entry of Batman with his tortured solo "The Graveyard Shift"; followed by "The Joker's Song (Where Does He Get All Those Wonderful Toys?)", "The Catwoman's Song (I Need All The Love I Can Get)", "We're Still The Children We Once Were" (the climactic sequence) and "In The Land Of The Pig The Butcher Is King", sung by the corrupt blood-suckers ruling Gotham, covered on the Meat Loaf album Bat Out of Hell III: The Monster Is Loose. After production was cancelled, these songs were released on the Batman: The Musical memorial site.

Charlie and the Chocolate Factory musical
During production on the film Charlie and the Chocolate Factory, a Broadway musical was planned to accompany it. The studio and Burton reiterated their interest in May 2003, however, the project was cancelled by the time the film was released.

Third Pee-wee Herman film
In 2008, Paul Reubens approached Burton with one of two scripts and talked to Johnny Depp about the possibility of having him portray Pee-wee in a potential third film, but they both declined.

9 sequel
In an interview with 9 director Shane Acker: "I think there is definitely room. I mean, the way we end the film, there is a slight suggestion that it may be a new beginning. And I think we could continue the journey from where we left off and see how these creatures are existing in a world in which the natural environment is coming back and perhaps even threatening them in some way. Do they make the decision to not affect it, or do they try to affect it in some way? And do they still try to hold on to that humanity within them or do they recognize themselves at being machines too and go off on a different trajectory? So there's lots of idea that I think that we could play with and make another story out of."

No plans for a sequel have been made, but possibilities were mentioned via the film's 2009 DVD commentary. Director Acker has also mentioned the possibility of a sequel being made because of the lack of darker animated films, claiming that everything is G- and PG-rated with little to no dark elements. In 2009 he said that he will continue to make darker animated films, either doing so with a sequel to 9 or original ideas for future films. Before the theatrical release of the film, Acker and Tim Burton stated they were open for a sequel, depending on how well the film was received. Since the film's home release, there have been no further mentions of a sequel, with Acker focusing on projects announced in 2012 (Deep) and 2013 (Beasts of Burden), neither of which have been released as of December 2017.

2010s

The Addams Family stop-motion animated film

In 2010, it was announced that Illumination Entertainment, in partnership with Universal Pictures, had acquired the underlying rights to the Addams Family drawings. The film was planned to be a stop-motion animated film based on Charles Addams's original drawings. Burton was set to co-write and co-produce the film, with a possibility to direct. In July 2013, it was reported that the film was cancelled. On October 31, 2013, it was announced in Variety that Metro-Goldwyn-Mayer would be reviving The Addams Family as an animated film with Pamela Pettler to write the screenplay and Andrew Mittman and Kevin Miserocchi to executive produce the film and were in final negotiations with BermanBraun's Gail Berman and Lloyd Braun to produce. By October 2017, Conrad Vernon had been hired to direct the film, which he will also produce along with Berman and Alex Schwartz, based on a screenplay written by Pettler, with revisions by Matt Lieberman. The film turned into the critically panned The Addams Family that was released on October 11, 2019. Burton would eventually return to the property in 2020, helping to develop a live-action television reboot with Miles Millar and Alfred Gough as showrunners.

Monsterpocalypse
In May 2010, DreamWorks announced that it had acquired the rights to a film adaptation of Monsterpocalypse, a Kaiju-themed collectible miniatures game. The studio had approached Burton for the project. On July 19, 2010, it was confirmed that Burton was attached to direct, but the film went unproduced partly due to Guillermo del Toro making his own Kaiju film called Pacific Rim in 2013. However, on May 3, 2016, Warner Bros acquired the project and hired Fede Álvarez to direct and co-write the film with Rodo Sayagues.

Alice in Wonderland musical
Stage adaptation Walt Disney Theatrical was in early talks with Burton and screenwriter Linda Woolverton to develop Alice in Wonderland as a Broadway musical. Woolverton authored the screenplay for Disney's The Lion King and is also the Tony Award-nominated book writer of Beauty and the Beast, Aida, and Lestat. Burton would have also rendered the overall designs for the stage musical. Woolverton would have adapted her screenplay for the stage production. Direction and choreography would have been done by Rob Ashford. The musical was aiming to make its world-premiere in London.

The Hunchback of Notre-Dame
In March 2011, it was announced that Burton was attached to direct a film of The Hunchback of Notre-Dame, which was supposed to feature and be co-produced by Josh Brolin but the film has been scrapped.

Pirates of the Caribbean: Dead Men Tell No Tales
In June 2011, it was reported that Burton was being considered to be selected as the director for Pirates of the Caribbean: Dead Men Tell No Tales, the fifth installment of the Pirates of the Caribbean film series, but he chose to direct Frankenweenie.

Maleficent
Burton was briefly attached to direct Maleficent for Walt Disney Pictures in 2011, but chose to pursue Dark Shadows and Frankenweenie instead.

Dark Shadows sequel
On December 7, 2011, Pfeiffer told MTV that she is hoping sequels will be made for the film. On May 8, 2012, Variety reported that Warner Bros. may want to turn Dark Shadows into a film franchise. On May 18, 2012, Collider mentioned that the ending of Dark Shadows lends itself to a possible sequel. When Burton was asked if he thought that this could be a possible start to a franchise, he replied, "No. Because of the nature of it being like a soap opera, that was the structure. It wasn't a conscious decision. First of all, it's a bit presumptuous to think that. If something works out, that's one thing, but you can't ever predict that. The ending had more to do with the soap opera structure of it."

Pinocchio
Robert Downey Jr. enlisted Burton to direct a Warner Bros. retelling of The Adventures of Pinocchio in 2012. Burton pursued Big Eyes and Ben Stiller was attached to direct.

Deep
On June 11, 2012, Shane Acker confirmed that Burton would work with Valve to create his next animated feature film, Deep. Like 9, the film will take place in a post-apocalyptic world (although set in a different universe). Deep would have been another darker animated film, as Shane Acker has expressed his interest in creating more PG-13 animated films. Since then, there has been no further announcements. However, despite the silence from Acker, in January 2017, the Facebook profile of the character "the Scientist" was updated with a rather cryptic message. The profile had been inactive since 2009, leading some to speculate the teasing of a sequel.

The Last American Vampire
On June 22, 2012, Abraham Lincoln: Vampire Hunter, based on novel of the same name, was released to theaters, with Timur Bekmambetov as director and Burton in a producing role, leading to speculation that the sequel book The Last American Vampire would be adapted as well. However, due to the film bombing in the box office and poor critical receptions, talks of a sequel were scrapped.

Miss Peregrine's Home for Peculiar Children sequels
On September 30, 2016, Burton's adaptation of Miss Peregrine's Home for Peculiar Children was released, leading to speculation that the sequel novels (Hollow City and Library of Souls) would be adapted as well. However, due to the mediocre box office returns of Peculiar Children, talks of a sequel have been scrapped.

References

Unrealized projects
Lists of unrealized projects by artist